The Edmond J. Safra Synagogue is an Orthodox Sephardic synagogue located on East 63rd Street off of Fifth Avenue in Manhattan, New York.

History
The synagogue project was initiated by philanthropist Edmond Safra before his death in 1999, and dedicated in 2003. Safra's goal was to have a Sephardic synagogue on Manhattan's Upper East Side.

During his lifetime, Safra was often in New York City and spent many a Shabbat in Manhattan. Noting the absence of a formal synagogue and communal center for the Sephardic Jews of the Upper East Side of Manhattan, he expressed a desire to build a central house of worship in the area. The synagogue was completed in December 2002. Dignitaries including the Chief Rabbi of Israel and Mayor Michael Bloomberg attended an official inauguration of the building.

The synagogue, whose congregational name is "Congregation Beit Yaakov" after Safra's father's name, was designed by architect Thierry W. Despont, and has been described as  a "sumptuous work of Beaux-Arts revival." The interior and facade of the building is made of Jerusalem stone  quarried in Judea. The massive bronze doors with their Tree of Life motif are by American sculptor Mark Beard.

Because it is located in a historic district, the synagogue design needed to receive approval from the landmarks commission, which called it an "artful synthesis of the composition, details and material palette of the Beaux-Arts style, which plays an important role in defining the special architectural character of the Upper East Side Historic District."

Community
Rabbi Shlomo Farhi became the Rabbi of Congregation Beit Edmond in mid-August 2018 following the departure of founding Rabbi Elie Abadie in January 2017.

The Safra name was attached to a Brooklyn synagogue named The Edmond J Safra Synagogue (EJSS) in Brooklyn, New York currently under construction at Avenue U & Ocean Parkway in the Gravesend Neighborhood. The new synagogue will house over 30,000 sq ft of community space including a bet midrash, mens mikveh, banquet social hall, kids programs, house multiple classes for weekly and daily events.

Firing of Rabbi Elie Abadie 
On January 31, 2017, Rabbi Elie Abadie, the first rabbi of the Edmond J. Safra Synagogue, was fired from his position. According to a December 28, 2016 letter from the Edmond J. Safra Philanthropic Foundation (the primary financial resource for the congregation), after failing to reach a financial agreement with Abadie after his contract expired in 2008 it “has determined that it cannot continue to support” the rabbi, who it says has continued to receive “approximately $700,000 per year, which includes a mortgage and condo fees on the apartment provided” to him. During contract negotiations, the foundation offered to continue paying his salary and benefits on the condition that he commit to a certain number of teaching hours at the synagogue, which Abadie refused, according to the letter.

The foundation and the rabbi then began in 2015 to negotiate his departure. The letter asserts that over the last two years, the rabbi rejected a generous buyout offer, demanded $20 million in payments, half of which “he specified would need to be ‘legally tax-sheltered,’” and refused an offer by the Chief Rabbi of Jerusalem, Shlomo Amar, to have the matter settled by a beit din, or religious court.

Rabbi Abadie, in a response dated December 30, 2016 and addressed to the congregation and “the greater Sephardi community of New York,” asserted that he is being forced out under false pretenses. “I completely dispute all of the malicious, false, baseless and self-serving allegations contained in the foundation’s letter,” he wrote. He denied “the foundation’s allegation of extortion,” and its “false narrative” that he put his own financial interests above the needs and interests of the community. Abadie accused the foundation of “bully tactics” and choosing to publicly shame him and his family. He said the foundation “has worked tirelessly to maintain dictatorial control over the congregation … operating with a lack of transparency,” and resisting his suggestions that a local board of directors be created and given power.

The European-based Edmond J. Safra Philanthropic Foundation, formerly chaired by the late Lily Safra, widow of the prominent banker and philanthropist, is active in more than 40 countries. According to an anonymous Sephardic community source quoted in the New York Post, Lily Safra found out Abadie had been doing consulting work for her nephew’s religious center, the Moise Safra Community Center. Lily did not get along with the late Moise Safra, and felt the rabbi’s decision to help was a betrayal, according to the source.

Following the Rabbi's departure in January 2017, the synagogue's name was changed to Congregation Beit Edmond. As of November 2020 Rabbi Abadie was the senior Rabbi of the Jewish council of the Emirates in Dubai.

References

Beaux-Arts architecture in New York City
Beaux-Arts synagogues
Upper East Side
Lebanese-American culture in New York (state)
Lebanese-Jewish culture in the United States
Orthodox synagogues in New York City
Synagogues completed in 2003
Synagogues in Manhattan
Sephardi Jewish culture in New York City
Syrian-American culture in New York City
Syrian-Jewish culture in New York (state)
2003 establishments in New York City